Samuel John Sutton (19 April 1836 – 7 September 1906) was an Australian politician.

Sutton was born in Hobart in Tasmania in 1836. In 1891 he was elected to the Tasmanian House of Assembly, representing the seat of South Launceston. He was defeated in 1897, but returned in 1901 after winning a by-election for Launceston and serving until 1903 when he was defeated for East Launceston. He died in 1906 in Launceston.

References

1836 births
1906 deaths
Members of the Tasmanian House of Assembly